Hassan Institute of Medical Sciences is a medical college located in Hassan, Karnataka run by the Government of Karnataka.The institution affiliated to Rajiv Gandhi University of Health Sciences

Attached Hospitals
The teaching hospitals attached to the institution is Government District Teaching Hospital Hassan.

Admissions

Undergraduate courses

M.B.B.S. 
The college offers the four and a half year M.B.B.S. course with a one-year compulsory rotating internship in affiliated hospitals.

Departments

ANATOMY
PHYSIOLOGY
BIOCHEMISTRY
PHARMACOLOGY
PATHOLOGY
MICROBIOLOGY
FORENSIC MEDICINE
COMMUNITY MEDICINE
GENERAL MEDICINE
PEDIATRIC
TB AND CHEST
SKIN & V D
PSYCHIATRY
GENERAL SURGERY
ORTHOPEDICS
ENT
OPHTHALMOLOGY
OBG
ANESTHESIA
RADIOLOGY
DENTISTRY

References

External links
 

Medical colleges in Karnataka